Hawk Nelson Is My Friend is the third full-length studio album from Christian rock band Hawk Nelson. It was released on April 1, 2008, debuting at No. 34 on the Billboard 200. In the first week of its release the album sold a little over 30,000 copies. Hawk Nelson wrote the songs, as usual together with Trevor McNevan, but this time also with Richard Marx and Raine Maida. The album was produced by award-winning David Bendeth (Paramore, The Red Jumpsuit Apparatus).

The album artwork, created by Invisible Creature, was nominated for a Grammy in 2008 for Best Recording Package.

Singles
"Friend Like That" was the first single from the album, released in the iTunes Store on December 24, 2007. A music video was filmed for the song. In 2008, "You Have What I Need" was released as the second single, as well as the track "One Little Miracle". Also the album track "Let's Dance" has been released in three versions as an EP.

Accolades 
In 2009, the album was nominated for a Dove Award for Recorded Music Packaging of the Year at the 40th GMA Dove Awards.

Track listing

Special edition

The special edition CD/DVD set of the album featured three bonus tracks, and a paper board game. It also included a DVD featuring behind the scenes videos: "In the Studio (with Amy Grant)", "The Making of the 'Friend Like That' Music Video", and "Skydiving", plus four of Hawk Nelson's music videos, including:
 "Friend Like That" originally recorded on Hawk Nelson Is My Friend
 "Zero" originally recorded on Smile, It's the End of the World
 "The One Thing I Have Left" originally recorded on Smile, It's the End of the World
 "California" originally recorded on Letters to the President

References

2008 albums
Hawk Nelson albums
BEC Recordings albums
Tooth & Nail Records albums
Albums produced by David Bendeth